Maitreyee Bose was an Indian politician. She was elected to the Lok Sabha, lower house of the Parliament of India from Darjeeling, West Bengal as an independent. She was earlier a member of the West Bengal Legislative Assembly as a member of the Indian National Congress.

References

External links
Official biographical sketch in Parliament of India website

India MPs 1967–1970
1905 births
Lok Sabha members from West Bengal
Year of death missing
Indian National Congress politicians
Independent politicians in India
People from Giridih district
People from Darjeeling district